Coelopleurus is an extant genus of echinoids with fossil records dating back to the Eocene, with remains found in Europe and North America.

Characteristics 

These abyssal sea urchins are characterized by their surprisingly bright color pattern, usually red and white. Even more surprisingly, their tests (skeletons) are brightly colored, too, even after drying, or sometimes fossilization.

Species
According to World Register of Marine Species: 
 Coelopleurus australis H.L. Clark, 1916
 Coelopleurus carolinensis Cooke, 1941a †
 Coelopleurus castroi Maury, 1930 †
 Coelopleurus exquisitus Coppard & Schultz, 2006
 Coelopleurus floridanus Agassiz, 1872
 Coelopleurus granulatus Mortensen, 1934
 Coelopleurus interruptus Döderlein, 1910
 Coelopleurus longicollis Agassiz & H.L. Clark, 1908
 Coelopleurus maculatus Agassiz & H.L. Clark, 1907
 Coelopleurus maillardi (Michelin, 1862)
 Coelopleurus melitensis Zammit-Maempel, 1969 †
 Coelopleurus singularis Nisiyama, 1966
 Coelopleurus undulatus Mortensen, 1934a
 Coelopleurus vittatus Koehler, 1927

Fossil species:
 †Coelopleurus elegans (Bell), from the Pleistocene of the Jizo-do formation of Japan

References

Further reading
 Kroh, A. (2014). Coelopleurus L. Agassiz, 1840a in Kroh, A. & Mooi, R. (2014) World Echinoidea Database (through World Register of Marine Species).

External links
 Coelopleurus in the Paleobiology Database
 

Arbacioida
Extant Eocene first appearances
Paleogene echinoderms of Europe
Prehistoric echinoderms of North America
Echinoidea genera